The 2010 UCI ProTour is the sixth series of the UCI ProTour: a series of 16 races in which the ProTour teams, considered the elite teams of the sport, participate alongside a number of invited "wildcard" teams. As in 2009, there is no competitive element to the ProTour of itself, but all its events contribute towards the 2010 UCI World Ranking. The first race was the 2010 Tour Down Under on 19–24 January, and the series will end with two new events, bringing the tour to North America for the first time, the Grand Prix Cycliste de Québec and the Grand Prix Cycliste de Montréal on 10 September and 12 September respectively.

The  team, although it has a ProTour Licence from the UCI valid until 2013, had its annual registration refused, and missed the first event of the tour while the matter remained unresolved. It subsequently received a temporary licence until 31 March, at which stage the full licence was restored. Immediately before the Tour de France in July, two more teams altered their names:  simplified their name to FDJ, while  became .

2010 UCI ProTour races 
Source:

Teams 
Source:

 known as  until 28 June.
 known as  until 2 July.

References

External links 
 

 
 ProTour
2010